Liam is a 2018 first-person documentary film directed by Isidore Bethel. It follows the director's own story as he moves to France after his best friend Liam dies back in the United States. Through documentary, performance, and stop motion animation, a ghostly portrait emerges of Liam, prompting Isidore to question his relationships with his parents and his boyfriend in Paris. The film premiered at the Boston LGBT Film Festival and received the Paris LGBTQ+ Film Festival's Documentary Jury Prize in 2018. The francophone streaming service Tënk acquired the film in 2019 for streaming.

The film met a modest but favorable reception: critics noted that "Bethel is most definitely a very talented cinematic voice" and characterized the film as "brilliant" and as a "documentary that's universal for how it questions grief and powerful for its analysis of the legacies that survivors bear."

References

External links 
 

2018 films
2018 documentary films
2018 LGBT-related films
American coming-of-age films
American documentary films
American LGBT-related films
Autobiographical documentary films
Documentary films about LGBT topics
Films shot in Atlanta
Films shot in France
Films shot in Paris
French coming-of-age films
2010s French-language films
French documentary films
French LGBT-related films
LGBT-related coming-of-age films
2010s English-language films
2010s American films
2010s French films